Valeria Chury (born 19 November 1990) is a Uruguayan footballer, who plays as a midfielder, and a futsal player, who plays for Club Banco República. She has been a member of the Uruguay women's national football team.

Club career
Chury has played football for Rampla Juniors in Uruguay.

International career
Chury capped for Uruguay at senior level during the 2010 South American Women's Football Championship.

References 

1990 births
Living people
Uruguayan women's footballers
Women's association football midfielders
Rampla Juniors players
Uruguay women's international footballers
Uruguayan women's futsal players